Shi Dongpeng (born January 6, 1984, in Hebei, People's Republic of China) is a Chinese hurdler who specializes in the 110 metre hurdles.

Shi won a silver medal at the 2002 World Junior Championships in Kingston, Jamaica, finished sixth at the 2003 World Championships in Paris, France, and won a silver medal at the 2006 Asian Games in Doha, Qatar. At the Asian Championships he won a gold in 2003 and silver in 2005.

Shi's personal best time is 13.19 seconds, achieved in August 2007 in Osaka, Japan, at the 2007 World Championships in Athletics.

Competition record

References

1984 births
Living people
Sportspeople from Baoding
Runners from Hebei
Chinese male hurdlers
Olympic athletes of China
Athletes (track and field) at the 2004 Summer Olympics
Athletes (track and field) at the 2008 Summer Olympics
Athletes (track and field) at the 2012 Summer Olympics
Asian Games medalists in athletics (track and field)
Athletes (track and field) at the 2002 Asian Games
Athletes (track and field) at the 2006 Asian Games
Athletes (track and field) at the 2010 Asian Games
World Athletics Championships athletes for China
Asian Games silver medalists for China
Medalists at the 2006 Asian Games
Medalists at the 2010 Asian Games